Cyber Chess is a chess-playing computer program developed by William Tunstall-Pedoe. It was written for the Acorn Archimedes and published commercially by The Fourth Dimension.

Development

Evaluation of moves was tuned by use of a genetic algorithm.

Gameplay

The game provides play against another human or the computer (at various levels of difficulty). Saved games and graphics export as vector Drawfiles are supported.

Reception
In Acorn User'''s games review of 1993/94, Cyber Chess was listed number 55 in the Best 100 Games. The game was well received by the magazines Acorn Computing and Archimedes World,  but the retail price of £35 was criticised by The Icon Bar'' in an article about the marketing of  games.

References

1993 video games
Acorn Archimedes games
Chess software
The Fourth Dimension (company) games